Happy Together is a 1994 studio album by the Leningrad Cowboys and the Alexandrov Ensemble.

Track listing

The Japanese issue of the album has a different track order and adds two bonus tracks:

BMG Ariola released a special "six pack" set of six CD singles comprising the entire album:

Personnel
The Leningrad Cowboys:
Twist Twist Erkinharju - drums
Ben Granfelt - guitar
Sakke Järvenpää - vocals
Jorma Marjaranta - vocals
Esa Niiva - saxophone
Pemo Ojala - trumpet
Silu Seppla - bass
Mauri Sumén - keyboards
Tokela - guitar
Mato Valtonen - vocals

EP/single
An EP titled Nokia Balalaika Show featuring three tracks from the album was released in Finland.

CD Plutonium/ PLUTOXCD 706 (Finland)
"Delilah" - 4:43
"Gimme All Your Lovin'" - 3:08
"Happy Together" - 2:49

A 3" single was released 21 Apr 1994 in Japan to support the album's release there

CD Ariola/ BVDP-102 (Japan)
"Gari Gari - Can Chu-hi"
"Gari Gari - Can Chu-hi" (Takara Version)
"Kasakka"

References

1994 albums
Leningrad Cowboys albums